Kinneret Zmora-Bitan Dvir is one of Israel's largest book publishing companies.

History
The company's oldest imprint, Dvir, was founded in Odessa in 1919 by Hayim Nahman Bialik. After the Russian Revolution, Dvir moved to Berlin and in 1924, to Mandate Palestine. Machbarot Lesifrut, the company's imprint for world literature in translation, was established by Israel Zmora in 1939. Zmora-Bitan was established in 1973 by Ohad Zmora and Asher Bitan. In 1986 Zmora-Bitan acquired Dvir, together with its affiliates Karni and Megiddo. Kinneret publishing house was founded by Yoram and Talma Roz in 1978. 

Kinneret was among the first houses to produce and market books with cassettes, board books and pop-up books for children

Today
 Kinneret-Zmora employs a staff of 70. It publishes around 300 new titles a year. On the retail side, Kinneret partners with the major book retailer Tzomet Sefarim, which has bout 40% of book retail market in Israel. The company is the member of the Book Publishers Association of Israel

References

External links
 Kinneret Zmora-Bitan Dvir - official website

Book publishing companies of Israel
Jewish printing and publishing
Publishing companies established in 1919